Aerotech Consumer Aerospace, established in 1982, is a company that supplies motors, kits, and components for mid and high-power rocketry.

The company's headquarters are located in Cedar City, Utah and its products are sold mainly through US and international dealers.  They specialize in APCP used in low-, mid-, and high-power rocket motors as well as supplying rocket kits designed around their motors.
Aerotech produces single use and reloadable motors in the mid-power range (D - G impulse).  They also produce high power rocket motor reloads, ranging from H to O impulse.  High power reloads require proper certification from the National Association of Rocketry or Tripoli Rocketry Association.  Until 2017, all reloads required the use of Aerotech, Rouse-Tech, or Dr. Rocket reload casings.  A recent cross-use certification agreement permits the use of 98mm Aerotech reloads in CTI (Cesaroni Technology Incorporated) hardware.

Corpulent Stump is the most powerful non commercial rocket ever launched on an Aerotech motor in the United Kingdom.

External links 
Official site

Aerospace companies of the United States
Rocket engines
Rocketry